Mecodema tenaki is a species of ground beetle found in the Cape Reinga region, Northland, New Zealand.

References

tenaki
Beetles of New Zealand
Beetles described in 2011